Dionne L. Price is an American statistician who works as a division director in the Office of Biostatistics of the Center for Drug Evaluation and Research, in the US Food and Drug Administration.
Her division provides statistical advice "used in the regulation of anti-infective, anti-viral, ophthalmology, and transplant drug products".

Education and career
Price is African-American, and grew up in Portsmouth, Virginia; her mother was a schoolteacher.
She majored in applied mathematics at Norfolk State University, earned a master's degree from the University of North Carolina,
and completed her Ph.D. at Emory University in 2000.
Her dissertation, Survival Models for Heterogeneous Populations with Cure, was supervised by Amita Manatunga,
and with it she became the first African-American to earn a doctorate in biostatistics at Emory.
After finishing her doctorate, she joined the Food and Drug Administration.

Recognition
Price was the keynote speaker at StatFest 2016, a one-day conference at Howard University organized by the American Statistical Association Committee on Minorities in Statistics to encourage statistical students from underrepresented groups.
She was elected as a Fellow of the American Statistical Association in 2018. She was "elected the 118th president of the American Statistical Association (ASA). She will serve a one-year term as president-elect beginning January 1, 2022; her term as president becomes effective January 1, 2023. She was elected to the 2022 class of Fellows of the American Association for the Advancement of Science (AAAS). Price will be the first African-American president of the ASA."

References

Year of birth missing (living people)
Living people
American statisticians
American women statisticians
African-American statisticians
Norfolk State University alumni
University of North Carolina alumni
Emory University alumni
21st-century African-American scientists
21st-century American mathematicians
21st-century American women scientists
21st-century African-American women
Presidents of the American Statistical Association
People from Portsmouth, Virginia
Food and Drug Administration people
Mathematicians from Virginia